In mathematics, a mixed boundary condition for a partial differential equation defines a boundary value problem in which the solution of the given equation is required to satisfy different boundary conditions on disjoint parts of the boundary of the domain where the condition is stated. Precisely, in a mixed boundary value problem, the solution is required to satisfy a Dirichlet or a Neumann boundary condition in a mutually exclusive way on disjoint parts of the boundary. 

and

The mixed boundary condition differs from the Robin boundary condition in that the latter requires a linear combination, possibly with pointwise variable coefficients, of the Dirichlet and the Neumann boundary value conditions to be satisfied on the whole boundary of a given domain.

Historical note

The first boundary value problem satisfying a mixed boundary condition was solved by Stanisław Zaremba for the Laplace equation: according to himself, it was Wilhelm Wirtinger who suggested him to study this problem.

See also

Dirichlet boundary condition
Neumann boundary condition
Cauchy boundary condition
Robin boundary condition

Notes

References
. In the paper "Existential analysis of the solutions of mixed boundary value problems, related to second order elliptic equation and systems of equations, selfadjoint" (English translation of the title), Gaetano Fichera gives the first proofs of existence and uniqueness theorems for the mixed boundary value problem involving a general second order selfadjoint elliptic operators in fairly general domains.
.
.
, translated from the Italian by Zane C. Motteler.

Boundary conditions
Partial differential equations